Morlino is an Italian surname. Notable people with the surname include:

Leonardo Morlino (born 1947), Italian political scientist
Robert C. Morlino (1946–2018), American Roman Catholic bishop
Tommaso Morlino (1925–1983), Italian politician

Italian-language surnames